Benjamin Joseph McCauley  (born September 6, 1986) is an American professional basketball player for Brujos de Guayama of the Baloncesto Superior Nacional (BSN). He played college basketball for North Carolina State University's Wolfpack before playing professionally in France, Belgium, Poland, Ukraine, Spain, Turkey, Puerto Rico and Israel.

Early life and college career
McCauley attended Yough Senior High School in Westmoreland County, Pennsylvania. He played college basketball for North Carolina State University's Wolfpack.

In his senior year at NC State, McCauley played 30 games and averaged 12.4 points, 7.8 rebounds and 2 assists per game.

Professional career
On March 7, 2011, McCauley signed with the French team Chorale Roanne Basket for the rest of the season.

On July 16, 2012, McCauley signed with the Polish team SKS Starogard Gdański for the 2012–13 season. On January 6, 2013, McCauley recorded a career-high 34 points, shooting 11-of-17 from the field, along with eight rebounds and two steals in an 85–81 win over Czarni Słupsk. In 30 games played during the 2012–13 season, McCauley averaged 18.8 points, 7.7 rebounds, 2 assists and 1 steal per game, shooting 42.9 percent from 3-point range.

On July 7, 2013, McCauley signed with the Ukrainian team BC Donetsk for the 2013–14 season. However, on March 24, 2014, McCauley parted ways with Donetsk to join the Spanish team CAI Zaragoza for the rest of the season, as a replacement for Joseph Jones.

On July 12, 2014, McCauley signed a one-year deal with the Turkish team Türk Telekom.

On February 19, 2018, McCauley signed with the Israeli team Maccabi Ashdod for the rest of the season as a replacement for David Laury. On April 1, 2018, McCauley recorded a season-high 19 points, shooting 8-of-11, along with ten rebounds in an 82–78 win over Bnei Herzliya. McCauley helped Ashdod reach the 2018 Israeli League Playoffs, where they eventually lost to Hapoel Tel Aviv. In 20 games played for Ashdod, McCauley averaged 9.7 points, 5.6 rebounds and 1.3 assist per game, shooting 41.9 percent from 3-point range.

On June 11, 2019, McCauley returned to Poland for a second stint, joining Wilki Morskie Szczecin.

On January 6, 2021, he has signed with Śląsk Wrocław of the PLK.

In the Summer of 2021, McCauley returned to Brujos de Guayama.

References

External links
Ben McCauley RealGM Profile
Ben McCauley FIBA Profile
Ben McCauley TBLStat.net Profile
Ben McCauley Eurobasket Profile
Ben McCauley  TBL Profile

1986 births
Living people
American expatriate basketball people in Belgium
American expatriate basketball people in France
American expatriate basketball people in Israel
American expatriate basketball people in Poland
American expatriate basketball people in Spain
American expatriate basketball people in Ukraine
American expatriate basketball people in Turkey
American men's basketball players
Basket Zaragoza players
Basketball players from Pennsylvania
BC Donetsk players
Chorale Roanne Basket players
Fort Wayne Mad Ants players
İstanbul Büyükşehir Belediyespor basketball players
Liga ACB players
Maccabi Ashdod B.C. players
NC State Wolfpack men's basketball players
Mersin Büyükşehir Belediyesi S.K. players
Power forwards (basketball)
SIG Basket players
Türk Telekom B.K. players